Ilia Balinov (born July 28, 1966 Batak, Bulgaria) is an Austrian chess player. He has played chess since he was 4 years old. He settled in Austria in 1991 and started representing Austria internationally from 1999. He received the Grandmaster (GM) title in 1999.

Notable Tournaments

References

Living people
1966 births
Austrian chess players
20th-century chess players
Chess grandmasters